An apostolic exhortation is a magisterial document written by the pope. It is considered third in importance, after apostolic constitutions and encyclicals. Exhortations generally encourage a particular virtue or activity. Apostolic exhortations are frequently issued following a Synod of Bishops, in which case they are known as post-synodal apostolic exhortations. They do not define Church doctrine and are not considered legislative.

Examples of apostolic exhortations

Pope Pius XII 
 Menti nostrae (The sanctity of priestly life, 1950)

Pope Paul VI 
 Evangelii nuntiandi (Evangelization in the Modern World, 1975)

Pope John Paul II 
 Catechesi Tradendae (Catechesis in Our Time, 1979)
 Familiaris consortio (The Christian Family in the Modern World, 1981)
 Christifideles laici (Christ's Faithful People, 1988)
 Ecclesia in America (The Church in America, 1999)
 Ecclesia in Asia (The Church in Asia, 1999)
 Ecclesia in Europa (The Church in Europe, 2003)
 Pastores gregis (For the Hope of the World, 2003)

Pope Benedict XVI 
 Africae munus (Africa's Commitment, 2011)
 Sacramentum caritatis (The Sacrament of Love, 2007)
 Verbum Domini (The Word of the Lord, 2010)

Pope Francis 
 Amoris Laetitia (The Joy of Love, 2016)
 Gaudete et exsultate (Rejoice and Be Glad, 2018)
 Christus vivit (Christ is Alive, 2019)
 Evangelii gaudium (The Joy of the Gospel, 2013)
 Querida Amazonia (Beloved Amazon, 2020), Post-synodal exhortation on the Amazon Region

References